Henry Clay Longnecker (April 17, 1820 – September 16, 1871) was a Republican member of the U.S. House of Representatives from Pennsylvania.

Early life
Longnecker was born in Allen Township, Pennsylvania. He graduated from the Norwich Military Academy in Vermont and from Lafayette College in Easton, Pennsylvania.  He studied law, was admitted to the bar and practiced in Easton.

He served during the Mexican–American War as first lieutenant, captain, and adjutant in all principal engagements under General Winfield Scott.  He was wounded at the Battle of Chapultepec on September 13, 1847.  He returned to Pennsylvania, and served as district attorney of Lehigh County, Pennsylvania, from 1848 to 1850.

Longnecker was elected as a Republican to the Thirty-sixth Congress.  During the American Civil War, Longnecker participated in organizing Pennsylvania troops and served in the Union Army as colonel of the Ninth Regiment, Pennsylvania Volunteers.  He resumed the practice of his profession in Allentown, Pennsylvania, in 1865.  He served as associate judge of Lehigh County in 1867, and died in Allentown in 1871.  Interment in Fairview Cemetery.

References
 Retrieved on 2008-02-14
Henry Clay Longnecker at The Political Graveyard

1820 births
1871 deaths
19th-century American judges
19th-century American lawyers
19th-century American politicians
American military personnel of the Mexican–American War
Military personnel from Pennsylvania
Pennsylvania lawyers
Pennsylvania state court judges
People from Lehigh County, Pennsylvania
Politicians from Northampton County, Pennsylvania
Republican Party members of the United States House of Representatives from Pennsylvania
Union Army colonels